Krasnoyarsk Krai is a federal subject of Russia (a krai), with its administrative center in the city of Krasnoyarsk, the third-largest city in Siberia (after Novosibirsk and Omsk). Comprising half of the Siberian Federal District, Krasnoyarsk Krai is the largest krai in the Russian Federation, the second largest federal subject (after neighboring Sakha) and the third largest subnational governing body by area in the world, after Sakha and the Australian state of Western Australia.

Geography

The krai lies in the middle of Siberia, and occupies nearly half of the Siberian Federal District, almost splitting it in half, stretching  from the Sayan Mountains in the south along the Yenisei River to the Taymyr Peninsula in the north. It borders (counting clockwise from the sea) the Sakha Republic, Irkutsk, the Tuva Republic, the Republic of Khakassia, Kemerovo, Tomsk, Tyumen Oblasts, the Khanty-Mansi Autonomous Okrug, the Yamalo-Nenets Autonomous Okrug and the Kara Sea and Laptev Sea of the Arctic Ocean in the north.

The krai is located in the basin of the Arctic Ocean; a great number of rivers that flow through the krai drain into it eventually. The main rivers of the krai are the Yenisei, and its tributaries (from south to north): the Kan, the Angara, the Podkamennaya Tunguska, the Nizhnyaya Tunguska and the Tanama.

There are also several thousand lakes in the krai. The largest lakes include Beloye, Belyo, Glubokoye, Itat, Khantayskoye, Labas, Lama, Pyasina, Taymyr, and Yessey. The rivers and lakes are rich in fish.

The climate is strongly continental with large temperature variations during the year. Long winters and short, hot summers are characteristic for the central and southern regions where most of the krai's population lives. The territory of Krasnoyarsk Krai experiences conditions of three climate belts: arctic, subarctic, and humid continental. In the north there are less than 40 days with temperature above , while in the south there are 110-120 such days.

Snow covers the central regions of the krai from early November until late March. Permafrost is absent at low altitudes south of Lesosibirsk, but as one moves north it grades from sporadic around the 58th parallel to extensive discontinuous around the 60th parallel and continuous north of the 63rd parallel.

The coastline contains several prominent peninsulas – from west to east the main ones are the Minina Peninsula, Mikhailov Peninsula, the Taymyr Peninsula (by far the largest, and itself containing the Zarya Peninsula, Oskara Peninsula and Chelyuskin Peninsula) and the Khara-Tumus Peninsula.

There are also a large number of islands off the krai's coast, the most prominent of which are (from west to east) Sibiryakov Island, Nosok Island, Dikson Island, Vern Island, Brekhovskiye Island (in the Yenisei Gulf), Krestovskiy Island, the Kamennye Islands, the Zveroboy Islands, the Labyrintovye Islands, the Plavnikovye Islands, Kolosovykh Island, the Mona Islands, Rykacheva Island, Gavrilova Island, Belukha and Prodolgovatyy Islands, the Nordenskiöld Archipelago, the Firnley Islands, the Heiberg Islands, Starokadomsky Island, Maly Taymyr Island, the Komsomolskaya Pravda Islands, the Faddey Islands, and the Saint Peter Islands. There are also a number of islands further out that fall under the administration of Krasnoyarsk Krai – the most prominent being Bolshoy Island, Sverdrup Island, the Izvestiy TSIK Islands, the Arkticheskiy Institut Islands, the Kirov Islands, Uyedineniya Island, Voronina Island, Severnaya Zemlya (the largest group), and Ushakov Island.

History

According to archaeologists, the first people reached Siberia circa 40,000 BC. The Andronovo culture, a group of Bronze Age peoples, lived in the area around 2000–900 BC, the remains of which were discovered in 1914 near the village of Andronovo, Uzhursky District. The grave-mounds and monuments of the Scythian culture in Krasnoyarsk Krai belong to the 7th century BC and are some of the oldest in Eurasia. A prince's grave, the Kurgan Arshan, discovered in 2001, is also located in the krai.

Russian settlement of the area (mostly by Cossacks) began in the 17th century. After the construction of the Trans-Siberian Railway the Russian colonization of the area strongly increased. In 1822, the Yeniseysk Governorate was created with Krasnoyarsk as its administrative center that covered territory very similar to that of the current krai.

During both the Tsarist and the Soviet times, the territory of Krasnoyarsk Krai was used as a place of exile of political enemies, actual or alleged. The first leaders of the Soviet state, Vladimir Lenin and Joseph Stalin, were exiled to what is now the krai in 1897–1900 and 1903, respectively. In Stalin's era, numerous Gulag camps were located in the region.

The force of the explosion is estimated to be about 10–15 megatons.

Krasnoyarsk Krai was created in 1934 after disaggregation of the West Siberian and East Siberian Krais and later included Taymyr and Evenk Autonomous Okrugs and Khakas Autonomous Oblast. In 1991, Khakassia separated from the krai and became a republic within the Russian Federation. On January 1, 2007, following a referendum on the issue held on April 17, 2005, the territories of Evenk and Taymyr Autonomous Okrugs were merged into the krai.

Politics

During the Soviet period, the high authority in the krai was shared between three persons: The first secretary of the Krasnoyarsk CPSU Committee (who in reality had the most authority), the chairman of the krai Soviet (legislative power), and the chairman of the krai Executive Committee (executive power). Since the Dissolution of the Soviet Union in 1991 and the demise of the CPSU, the head of the krai administration, and eventually the governor has been appointed or elected alongside the elected regional parliament.

The Charter of Krasnoyarsk Krai is the fundamental law of the region. The Legislative Assembly of Krasnoyarsk Krai is the province's regional standing legislative (representative) body. The Legislative Assembly exercises its authority by passing laws, resolutions, and other legal acts and by supervising the implementation and observance of the laws and other legal acts passed by it. The legislative assembly consists of 52 deputies. 22 of them are elected in 22 one-mandate electoral districts by plurality system, 2 in Taymyr, 2 in Evenkia, and 26 are elected by proportional system from the lists offered by political parties. The highest executive body is the Oblast Government, which includes territorial executive bodies such as district administrations, committees, and commissions that facilitate development and run the day-to-day matters of the province. The Oblast administration supports the activities of the Governor who is the highest official and acts as the guarantor of the observance of the krai Charter in accordance with the Constitution of Russia.

In December 1991, president Boris Yeltsin appointed Arkady Veprev as the first governor of Krasnoyarsk Krai. In January 1993 Yeltsin appointed Valery Zubov as the second governor of Krasnoyarsk Krai. In Krasnoyarsk Territory governor elections were called. Zubov was elected in a universal election for a five-year term. The Legislative Assembly of Krasnoyarsk Krai was created as well.

In 1998, Zubov lost in the gubernatorial election to General Aleksandr Lebed, a well-known politician in all of Russia. In 2002 Lebed died in a helicopter accident.

In 2002, Alexander Khloponin, the governor of Taymyr Autonomous Okrug and an influential businessman, was elected a governor of Krasnoyarsk Krai. In 2007, he was nominated by president Vladimir Putin for re-election, and the legislative assembly elected Khloponin for the second term.

In 2010, after Khloponin was promoted to the office of the president's envoy in the North Caucasian Federal District, Lev Kuznetsov, a businessman and politician from Khloponin's circle, became the new governor of the krai. After Kuznetsov, Viktor Tolokonsky became Governor September 2017. After Tolokonsky, Aleksandr Uss became the Governor of Krasnoyarsk Krai where he remains in the role today.

Krasnoyarsk Krai is represented in the Federation Council of Russia, the upper house of the Russian parliament by two senators. In 2007, eight deputies were elected to the State Duma from Krasnoyarsk regional lists of different political parties.

Economy
Over 95% of the cities, a majority of the industrial enterprises, and all of the agriculture are concentrated in the south of the krai.

Natural resources

The krai is among the richest of Russia's regions in natural resources: 80% of the country's nickel, 75% of its cobalt, 70% of its copper, 16% of its coal, and 10% of its gold are extracted here. Krasnoyarsk also produces 20% of the country's timber. More than 95% of Russian resources of platinum and platinoids are concentrated in the krai.

Industry
The krai's major industries are: non-ferrous metallurgy, energy, forestry, chemicals, and oil refining. The major financial-industrial groups of Krasnoyarsk Krai are:
Basic Element (Krasnoyarsk Aluminium Plant, Achinsk Alumina Complex, Krasnoyarsk Pulp and Paper Plant)
Interros (Norilsk Nickel)
Evraz Group (iron mines, timber)
MDM Group (SUEK, Siberian Coal and Energy Company)
RusHydro (generation of electric power)
RZhD (railroads)
Information Satellite Systems Reshetnev satellite manufacturing

Power generation
The two most powerful hydroelectric plants in Russia are at the Yenisei River: 
 Sajano-Schuschensk reservoir (Саяно-Шушенское водохранилище: 621 km2; 31.300 Mio. m³; 6400 MW)
 Krasnoyarsk Reservoir (2130 km2; 73.300 Mio. m³; 6000 MW)
Three are at its tributary Angara River: 
 Irkutsk Hydroelectric Power Station (45.800 Mio. m³; 660 MW)
 Bratsk Reservoir (5426 km2; 169.270 Mio. m³; 4500 MW)
 Ust-Ilimsk reservoir (Усть-Илимское водохранилище: 1873 km2; 59.300 Mio. m³; 4320 MW)

It makes Krasnoyarsk Krai one of Russia's most important producers of electric energy and a desirable location for energy-intensive industries, such as aluminum plants.

Transportation
Trans-Siberian Railroad (650 km (400 mi) within Krasnoyarsk Krai), Norilsk Railroad (the most northern railroad in the world); North Siberian Railroad is planned.
Highways: M53 Baikal (Novosibirsk-Krasnoyarsk-Irkutsk), M54 Yenisei (Krasnoyarsk-Kyzyl-Mongolia) R409 Eniseiskiy trakt (Krasnoyarsk-Lesosibirsk-Yeniseysk).
Northern Sea Route and shipping on the Yenisei. The main ports are: Dudinka, Igarka, Turukhansk, Yeniseysk, Maklakovo, Strelka, Krasnoyarsk
26 airports, including an international airport (Yemelyanovo near Krasnoyarsk).
Two pipes of Irkutsk-Anzhero-Sudzhensk petroleum pipeline.
Major power transmission lines.

Administrative divisions

Krasnoyarsk Krai consists of forty-four districts and sixteen towns of district significance. Two of the districts (Evenkiysky and Taymyrsky; the former autonomous okrugs) have special status.

Demographics

Population (including former Taymyr and Evenk Autonomous Okrugs): 

Ethnic groups: The population of the krai mostly consists of Russians, and some other peoples of the former Soviet Union. The indigenous Siberian peoples make up no more than 1% of the population.

The 2021 Census reported the following ethnic composition:

100,621 people were registered from administrative databases, and could not declare an ethnicity. It is estimated that the proportion of ethnicities in this group is the same as that of the declared group.
Births (Jan-Aug 2009): 25,520 (13.3 per 1000) 
Deaths (Jan-Aug 2009): 25,183 (13.1 per 1000)

As of August 2009, Krasnoyarsk Krai recorded a natural growth of population for the first time in 16 years.

Total fertility rate:
2003 - 1.35 | 2004 - 1.35 | 2005 - 1.31 | 2006 - 1.33 | 2007 - 1.44 | 2008 - 1.55 | 2009 - 1.61 | 2010 - 1.64 | 2011 - 1.64 | 2012 - 1.75 | 2013 - 1.78 | 2014 - 1.81 | 2015 - 1.84 | 2016 - 1.82(e)

Vital statistics for 2012
Births: 41,098 (14.5 per 1000)
Deaths: 36,726 (12.9 per 1000) 
Total fertility rate: 1.75

Settlements

Demographics for 2007

Religion

As per the survey conducted in 2012, 29.6% of the population of Krasnoyarsk Krai adheres to the Russian Orthodox Church, 5% declares to be a nondenominational Christian (excluding Protestant churches), 2% is an Orthodox Christian believer without belonging to any church or is a member of other (non-Russian) Orthodox churches, 1.5% is Muslim, 1% follows the Slavic native faith (Rodnovery), and 10.9% did not give an answer to the survey. In addition, 35% of the population declares to be "spiritual but not religious" and 15% to be atheist.

Education
Krasnoyarsk is the site of the Siberian Federal University, one of Russia's four largest educational institutions. Other notable higher education institutes of the krai are:
 Krasnoyarsk State Pedagogical University (Russian abbreviation is KGPU), founded in 1932
 Siberian State Technological University (Russian abbreviation is SibGTU), the oldest in the city, founded in 1930 as the Siberian Institute of Forestry
 Siberian State Aerospace University (Russian abbreviation is SibGAU), founded in 1960
 Krasnoyarsk State Medical University (Russian abbreviation is KrasGMU), founded in 1942
 Krasnoyarsk State Agrarian University (Russian abbreviation is Krasnoyarsk GAU), founded in 1952

See also
List of chairmen of the Legislative Assembly of Krasnoyarsk Krai

References

Notes

Sources

External links

Official website of Krasnoyarsk Krai 
Putorana Plateau at Natural Heritage Protection Fund
Пантелеев В. НА ПЕРЕЛОМЕ: Аркадий Вепрев у руля. Победа Валерия Зубова на губернаторских выборах//Красноярский рабочий.- 2011. - №145.- 19 августа.

 
1934 establishments in the Soviet Union
States and territories established in 1934
Russian-speaking countries and territories
Kara Sea
Laptev Sea
Krais of Russia